Jean Lorrah (born 1940) is an American science fiction and fantasy author. She has produced several Star Trek novels, frequently with her writing and business partner Jacqueline Lichtenberg. Her most recent work with Lichtenberg is on the Sime~Gen Universe. Her fantasy series The Savage Empire, from the 1980s, is mostly solo work.

Lorrah taught English at Murray State University from 1968-2008 and received her Ph.D. from Florida State University. She was the first female non-nursing/home economics doctorate professor hired at MSU.

Bibliography

"Savage Empire" series
 Savage Empire (1981)
 Dragon Lord of the Savage Empire (1982)
 Captives of the Savage Empire (1984)
 Flight to the Savage Empire (1986) (with Winston Howlett)
 Sorcerers of the Frozen Isles (1986)
 Wulfston's Odyssey (1986) (with Winston Howlett)
 Empress Unborn (1988)
 Dark Moon Rising (omnibus) (2004) - reprinted collection of the first three novels
 Prophecies (omnibus) (2004) - reprinted collection of the fourth and fifth novels

"Nessie" series (with Lois Wickstrom)
 Nessie and The Living Stone (2001)
 Nessie and the Viking Gold (2003)

"Sime~Gen" series
 First Channel (1980) (with Jacqueline Lichtenberg)
 Channel's Destiny (1982) (with Jacqueline Lichtenberg)
 Ambrov Keon (1985)
 Zelerod's Doom (1986) (with Jacqueline Lichtenberg)
 The Unity Trilogy (2003) (omnibus) (with Jacqueline Lichtenberg)

Non-series novels
 Pandora No 6 (1980)
 Blood Will Tell (2001)

Star Trek series contributions

Star Trek
 Full Moon Rising (1976)
 The Night of the Twin Moons (1976)
 Epilogue: Part I (1977)
 Epilogue: Part II (1978)

Star Trek : The Original Series
 The Vulcan Academy Murders (1984)
 The IDIC Epidemic (1988)

Star Trek : The Next Generation
 Survivors (1988)
 Metamorphosis (1990)

References

External links
 Fables.org
 Profile at the department of English at Murray State University
 
 Jean Lorrah's Website

Living people
1940 births
American science fiction writers
American fantasy writers
Florida State University alumni
Murray State University faculty
20th-century American novelists
21st-century American novelists
20th-century American women writers
21st-century American women writers
Women science fiction and fantasy writers
American women novelists
Novelists from Kentucky
American women academics